Cathi Hanauer (born in Fort Monmouth, New Jersey) is an American novelist, journalist, essayist, and non-fiction writer. Her novels include Gone (2012), Sweet Ruin (2006),  and My Sister's Bones (1996). She conceived and edited the 2002 New York Times best-selling essay anthology The Bitch in the House: 26 Women Tell the Truth about Sex, Solitude, Work, Motherhood and Marriage  and the 2016 sequel "The Bitch is Back: Older, Wiser, and (Getting) Happier," which was an NPR "Best Book" of 2016.  She is a co-founder, along with her husband, Daniel Jones, of The New York Times column "Modern Love".

Hanauer's articles, essays and criticism have appeared in "The New York Times", "The Washington Post, Elle, O-the Oprah Magazine, Real Simple, Glamour, Self, Whole Living, and other magazines. She wrote the monthly books column for both Glamour and Mademoiselle and was the monthly relationships advice columnist for Seventeen for seven years. A graduate of the Newhouse School at Syracuse University  and of the MFA program at the University of Arizona,  she has taught writing at The New School, in New York, and at the University of Arizona, in Tucson. She has two children and lives in Western Massachusetts and New York City.

References

1962 births
Living people
People from Monmouth County, New Jersey
20th-century American novelists
21st-century American novelists
American women novelists
American women journalists
20th-century American women writers
21st-century American women writers
Novelists from New Jersey
20th-century American non-fiction writers
21st-century American non-fiction writers